Xiao Wu, also known as Pickpocket, is a 1997 Chinese drama and the first directed by Jia Zhangke. Starring Wang Hongwei in the titular role along with Hao Hongjian and Zuo Baitao, it was filmed in Fenyang, Jia's hometown, in 16 mm.

Synopsis
In a small, dirty, poor provincial town looking to crack down on crime in 1997, and under the backdrop of the transfer of sovereignty over Hong Kong, Xiao Wu is one of a group of pickpockets, most of whom have moved on to become small traders and legal or semi-legal. One of them, formerly a close friend, is getting married and decides not to invite Xiao Wu, a reminder of the past. He drifts around, discontent with life, but makes no effort to change. He acquires a girlfriend, a prostitute who takes a liking to him, but she drops him when she finds someone better. He visits his poor-peasant family but ends up arguing with his parents and saying he won't ever return. Finally he gets arrested and is left handcuffed in the middle of the street with a disapproving crowd watching him.

Production history
While a student in the mid-1990s, Jia Zhangke remained a relative unknown at China's prestigious Beijing Film Academy. While still in school, Jia directed the short film Xiao Shan Going Home which he was eventually able to screen abroad, winning the top prize at the 1997 Hong Kong Independent Short Film & Video Awards

This success brought Jia into contact with cinematographer Yu Lik-wai and producer Li Kit Ming.  With their support, Jia was able to begin work on Xiao Wu, which would become his first feature film. Xiao Wu was shot on a mere 400,000 RMB budget (or about $50,000 US).

Reception
Xiao Wu was praised by the American filmmaker Martin Scorsese, a noted fan of Jia's works.

Awards and nominations
Berlin International Film Festival, Forum section, 1997
 NETPAC Award
 Wolfgang Staudte Award
Buenos Aires International Festival of Independent Cinema, 1999
 Official selection
Nantes Three Continents Festival, 1998
 Golden Montgolfiere (Tied with Wandâfuru raifu)Pusan International Film Festival, 1998
 New Currents Award 	San Francisco International Film Festival, 1999
 SKYY Prize 	Vancouver International Film Festival''' 1998
 Dragons and Tigers Award

Notes

External links

Xiao Wu at the Chinese Movie Database

1997 films
1998 films
1997 drama films
Chinese independent films
Films directed by Jia Zhangke
Films set in 1997
Films set in China
Films set in Shanxi
1990s Mandarin-language films
1997 directorial debut films